Catholic liturgy can refer to the various Christian liturgies of the Catholic Church. It may also refer to various particular liturgies and liturgical rites:

Liturgies
Mass (liturgy), a form of Eucharistic liturgical practice
Mass in the Catholic Church
Tridentine Mass, a traditional form of the Catholic Mass
Divine Liturgy, a form of Eucharistic liturgical practice, particularly among Eastern Catholics
Liturgy of the Hours, Catholic forms of celebrating the canonical hours

Liturgical families
Catholic particular churches and liturgical rites, describing sui iuris Catholic churches and their liturgical groupings
Latin liturgical rites, the liturgical practices of the Latin Church
Roman Rite, the predominant form of Catholic liturgy
Eastern Catholic liturgy, describing the history and variety of liturgical practices in the Eastern Catholic Churches

Other
Sacraments of the Catholic Church, the major rites of the Catholic Church typically accompanied by a liturgical celebration